Chromidina elegans is a species of ciliates, described in 2016. It is parasitic in the kidney appendages of the cuttlefish Loligo vulgaris. The type-locality is off Tunisia in the Mediterranean Sea.

The name of the species refers to French biologist Édouard Chatton, who worked on species of Chromidina.

References 

Oligohymenophorea
Protists described in 2016
Biota of Tunisia
Parasites of molluscs
Parasitic alveolates
Ciliate species